Turris normandavidsoni is a species of sea snail, a marine gastropod mollusk in the family Turridae commonly called the turrids.

Name
The discoverer of this species, Baldomero Olivera, named it after a professor of his, Caltech biologist Norman Davidson.

Description
The length of the shell attains 71 mm.

Distribution
This species is native to waters of the Philippines.; also off Papua New Guinea.

References

 Liu, J.Y. [Ruiyu] (ed.). (2008). Checklist of marine biota of China seas. China Science Press. 1267 pp
 Kilburn R.N., Fedosov A.E. & Olivera B.M. (2012) Revision of the genus Turris Batsch, 1789 (Gastropoda: Conoidea: Turridae) with the description of six new species. Zootaxa 3244: 1-58.

normandavidsoni
Gastropods described in 1999